The solitary sandpiper (Tringa solitaria) is a small shorebird. The genus name Tringa is the New Latin name given to the green sandpiper by Aldrovandus in 1599 based on Ancient Greek trungas, a thrush-sized, white-rumped, tail-bobbing wading bird mentioned by Aristotle. The specific solitaria is Latin for "solitary" from solus, "alone".

Description
It is a dumpy wader with a dark green back, greyish head and breast and otherwise white underparts. It is obvious in flight, with wings dark above and below, and a dark rump and tail centre. The latter feature distinguishes it from the slightly larger and broader-winged, but otherwise very similar, green sandpiper of Europe and Asia, to which it is closely related. The latter species has a brilliant white rump. In flight, the solitary sandpiper has a characteristic three-note whistle. They both have brown wings with little light dots, and a delicate but contrasting neck and chest pattern. In addition, both species nest in trees, unlike most other scolopacids.

Distribution and habitat
It breeds in woodlands across Alaska and Canada. It is a migratory bird, wintering in Central and South America, especially in the Amazon River basin, and the Caribbean. It is a very rare vagrant to western Europe, and goes there in the summer-autumn period.

Subspecies
The solitary sandpiper is split into two subspecies:

T. s. cinnamomea, (Brewster, 1890): breeds in Alaska & western Canada
T. s. solitaria, (Wilson, 1813): breeds from eastern British Columbia to Labrador

Behaviour
As its name indicates, the solitary sandpiper is not a gregarious species, usually seen alone during migration, although sometimes small numbers congregate in suitable feeding areas. The solitary sandpiper is very much a bird of fresh water, and is often found in sites, such as ditches, too restricted for other waders, which tend to like a clear all-round view.

Breeding
The sandpiper lays a clutch of 3–5 eggs in abandoned tree nests of songbird species, such as those of thrushes. The young birds are encouraged to drop to the ground soon after hatching.

Feeding
Food is small invertebrates: insects (such as mosquito larvae, young midges, grasshoppers, caterpillars and beetles), small crustaceans and molluscs (such as snails extracted from their shells), sometimes small frogs (primarily as tadpoles), picked off the mud as the bird works steadily around the edges of its chosen pond.

References

External links

 Solitary sandpiper - Tringa solitaria - USGS Patuxent Bird Identification InfoCenter
 Solitary sandpiper species account - Cornell Lab of Ornithology
 
 
 
 

solitary sandpiper
solitary sandpiper
Native birds of Alaska
Birds of Canada
Birds of the Caribbean
Birds of Hispaniola
Birds of the Dominican Republic
Birds of Central America
Birds of South America
solitary sandpiper
Taxa named by Alexander Wilson (ornithologist)